Eduardo Dasent (born 12 October 1988) is a Panamanian football defender who currently plays for Liga Panameña de Fútbol side Independiente La Chorrera.

Club career
Dasent started a lengthy spell at Tauro in 2006. He had loan spells at Guatemalan side Marquense and Colombian club Atlético Bucaramanga. He joined Independiente in July 2014.

International career
Dasent was part of the Panama U-20 squad that participated in the 2007 FIFA World Youth Cup in Canada.

He made his senior debut for Panama in a November 2010 friendly match against Honduras and has, as of 8 June 2015, earned a total of 17 caps, scoring no goals. He represented his country in 5 FIFA World Cup qualification matches and played at the 2011 CONCACAF Gold Cup.

Honors

Club
Liga Panameña de Fútbol (1): 2007 (A)

References

External links

1988 births
Living people
Sportspeople from Panama City
Association football defenders
Panamanian footballers
Panama international footballers
2011 CONCACAF Gold Cup players
2013 Copa Centroamericana players
Tauro F.C. players
Deportivo Marquense players
Atlético Bucaramanga footballers
Expatriate footballers in Colombia
Expatriate footballers in Guatemala